Andalusian language may refer to:

 Andalusian Spanish, a Spanish dialect spoken in Andalusia
 Andalusian language movement, a fringe movement aiming for the recognition of Andalusian as a different language from Spanish
 Andalusi Arabic or Andalusian Arabic, a dialect of Arabic formerly spoken in Iberia